Haplotinea insectella, the drab clothes moth or fungus grain moth, is a moth of the family Tineidae. It was described by Johan Christian Fabricius in 1794. It is found in all of Europe, except Ireland, the Iberian Peninsula and the western and southern part of the Balkan Peninsula. It is also found in North America. The species is often found in warehouses, granaries, mills and farm buildings.

The wingspan is 11–20 mm. The forewings are light brown with dark spots and two discal dots. The hindwings are greyish brown with a purplish sheen. Adults are on wing from the end of May to the beginning of August, probably in one generation per year.

The larvae feed on a wide range of animal and plant matter, including dried goods, cereals, grain, rice, nuts, seeds, rotten wood, detritus, animal waste, as well as fungi growing on tree trunks.

References

External links
 Haplotinea insectella in Norfolkmoths

Myrmecozelinae
Moths described in 1794
Moths of Europe
Moths of North America
Insects of Turkey
Taxa named by Johan Christian Fabricius